Fairy Meadow railway station is located on the South Coast railway line in New South Wales, Australia. It serves the northern Wollongong suburb of Fairy Meadow opening in 1887 as Cramsville. It was renamed Para-meadow on 3 October 1888, Balgownie on 13 December 1909 and Fairy Meadow in January 1956.

The station underwent maintenance in early 2011. This included the resurfacing of the two platforms, new garden beds underneath the stairs and repainted exteriors. During 2013, the level crossing was upgraded. Featuring newer and safer barriers, louder sound alert and resurfaced walkway over the rail.

On 4 October 2019, a man between the age of 35 and 45 was hit and killed by a train passing through the station.

Platforms & services
Fairy Meadow has two side platforms serviced by NSW TrainLink South Coast line services travelling from Waterfall and Thirroul to Port Kembla. Some peak hour and late night services operate to Sydney Central, Bondi Junction and Kiama.

References

External links

Fairy Meadow station details Transport for New South Wales

Buildings and structures in Wollongong
Railway stations in Australia opened in 1888
Regional railway stations in New South Wales
Fairy Meadow, New South Wales